Kerstin Granstedt (born 27 December 1935) is a Swedish orienteering competitor. She became Relay World Champion in Fiskars in 1966, as a member of the Swedish winning team, with Eivor Steen-Olsson and Gunborg Åhling. She finished fourth in the individual event at these championships, which were the very first World Championships in Orienteering.

At the 1968 World Orienteering Championships in Linköping Granstedt won an individual bronze medal, and a silver medal in the relay event together with Gun-Britt Nyberg and Ulla Lindkvist.

References

1935 births
Living people
Swedish orienteers
Female orienteers
Foot orienteers
World Orienteering Championships medalists
20th-century Swedish women